One Foot in the Groove is an album by Koerner, Ray & Glover, released in 1996. It was the last release by the trio.

Reception

Track listing
 "Black Jack Davy" (traditional) – 2:53
 "Shout Sister Shout" (Yank Rachell) – 3:19
 "Shenandoah" (traditional) – 2:50
 "Terra Mae" (E. Ross) – 2:51
 "Shortnin' Bread" (traditional) – 2:33
 "With Body and Soul" (Bill Monroe, Virginia Stouffer) – 2:46
 "Deliah's Gone" (traditional) – 2:52
 "France Blues" (Harvey Hull, "Cleve" Reed) – 4:11
 "Dodger" (traditional) – 2:57
 "Way Back Down Home" (F. Sproule) – 3:32
 "Power Tool" (Tony Glover) – 2:22
 "Pick Poor Robin Clean" (Luke Jordan) – 2:49
 "Boys Were Shooting It Out" (John Koerner) – 2:47
 "You Got to Move" (Reverend Gary Davis) – 2:37
 "I Ain't Blue" (Koerner, Willie Murphy) – 3:13
 "Black Dog Blues" (traditional) – 3:10

Personnel
Tony "Little Sun" Glover – harmonica, vocals
"Spider" John Koerner – guitar, harmonica, percussion, vocals
Dave "Snaker" Ray – guitar, slide guitar, vocals
Production notes
Mark Trehus – producer
Stefan Kren – engineer
John Thompson – design
Daniel Corrigan – cover photo

References

External links
Koerner, Ray and Glover discography

Koerner, Ray & Glover albums
1996 live albums